A fireman is a firefighter.  It may also be used restrictively to refer only to male firefighters.

Fireman or Firemen may also refer to:

Basic meanings
 Fireman (steam engine), an individual employed to tend the fire for running a steam engine, either on a stationary engine, a railway locomotive or a steamship
 A United States Navy or United States Coast Guard rate for an enlisted seaman who works on ships' propulsion systems, even though steamships are no longer used

Sports
 Fireman (baseball), a baseball player who enters the game after the starting pitcher is removed

Film
 The Fireman (1916 film), a Charlie Chaplin film
The Fireman (1931 film), a short animated film distributed by Universal Pictures
Fireman (film), a 2015 Malayalam film
 An individual employed to start fires to burn books in the novel and film Fahrenheit 451
 Fireman (TV series), a Japanese TV series known as Magma Man in some markets
 Fire Man (Mega Man), a Robot Master from the video game series Mega Man

Music
 The Fireman, an alternative name used by Capleton, a Jamaican reggae artist
 The Fireman (band), an electronic music duo consisting of English musicians Paul McCartney and Youth
 Fireman (album), an album by hHead

Songs
 "Fireman" (song), from Lil Wayne's 2005 studio album Tha Carter II
 "Fireman", single by The Cravats	1982
 "Fireman", single by Steve Kilbey	1987
 "Fireman", single by Jawbreaker 1995

Other
 Fireman (peyote), a role within ceremonies of the Native American Church
 Fireman Sam

See also
 
 
 
 Firefighter (disambiguation)
 Fire Fighters (disambiguation)